Lo Fi Acoustic Excursions is the first of two albums released by Mike Badger featuring a compilation of his various musical incarnations including the La's and The Onset, its sister album being Lo Fi Electric Excursions. Lo Fi Acoustic Excursions was released by the Generator Label in 2004. It contains a collection of songs, outtakes, ideas and sketches from 1983 to 2003.

Track listing
All words and music by Mike Badger, except track 5 by Bob Nolan; track 11 by Mike Badger and Paul Hemmings.
 "2022 Blues" - The Onset (1994) – 1.56
 "It's True" - Mike Badger and The Establishment" (2001) – 3:05
 "Save Me" - The Onset (1991) – 3:46
 "South End Hoedown" - The Two Step Angels (1987) – 1:14
 "Cool Water" - The La's (1986) – 3:57
 "Sacramento" - Mike Badger (1999) – 0:40
 "Lovin' On Our Side" - Mike Badger and the Northern Lights (2002) – 2:29
 "Intermission" - Mike Badger and T.V.Set (1995) – 2:09
 "No Bitterness Holds Sweetness" - Mike Badger (2000) – 2:36
 "Walking Tall" - The Onset (1995) – 3:03
 "Autumn In The Mind" - Mike Badger (1998) – 3:01
 "Water Tiger" - Mike Badger (2001) – 1:15
 "Dig It" - The Renegades (2002) – 2:23
 "Life Story" - Mike Badger and the Northern Lights (2003) – 3:41
 "The Day I Grew Forever" - Roy G Biv (1983) – 2:22

Musicians
 Mike Badger - vocals, Spanish guitar, acoustic guitar, percussion, T.V.
 Danny Dean - acoustic guitar, twelve string guitar (tracks 3, 7, 10 and 12)
 Simon Cousins - bass guitar, acoustic bass, backing vocals (track 3 and 10)
 Paul Hemmings - piano, organ, acoustic guitar, mandolin, bass (tracks 2, 3 and 11)
 Tony Russell - percussion (track 10)
 Roger Llewellyn - backing vocals, ukulele banjo, harmonica, banjo, voice jug (tracks 1, 4 and 10)
 Steve Roberts - backing vocals (track 12)
 Lee Mavers - acoustic guitar, backing vocals (track 5)
 Martyn Campbell - backing vocals, bass, percussion, acoustic guitar (tracks 2, 7 and 14)
 Henry Priestman - organ, keyboards (tracks 9, 11 and 14)

Reviews

References

2004 compilation albums
Mike Badger albums